The Ohio Lands were the several grants, tracts, districts and cessions which make up what is now the U.S. state of Ohio. The Ohio Country was one of the first settled parts of the Midwest, and indeed one of the first settled parts of the United States beyond the original Thirteen Colonies. The land that became first the anchor of the Northwest Territory and later Ohio was cobbled together from a variety of sources and owners.

List of Ohio Lands
 Canal Lands
 Miami & Erie Canal Lands
 Ohio & Erie Canal Lands
 College Township
 Congress Lands or Congressional Lands (1798–1821)
 Congress Lands North of Old Seven Ranges
 Congress Lands West of Miami River
 Congress Lands East of Scioto River
 North and East of the First Principal Meridian
 South and East of the First Principal Meridian
 Connecticut Western Reserve
 Dohrman Tract
 Ephraim Kimberly Grant
 Firelands or Sufferers' Lands
 Fort Washington
 French Grant
 Indian Land Grants
 Maumee Road Lands
 Michigan Survey or Michigan Meridian Survey or Toledo Tract
 Ministerial Lands
 Moravian Indian Grants
 Gnadenhutten Tract
 Salem Tract
 Schoenbrunn Tract
 Ohio Company of Associates
 Purchase on the Muskingum
 Donation Tract
 College Lands
 Refugee Tract
 Salt Reservations or Salt Lands
 School Lands
 Seven Ranges or Old Seven Ranges
 Symmes Purchase or Miami Purchase and/or the Land Between the Miamis
 Toledo Strip, object of a nearly bloodless war between Ohio and Michigan
 Turnpike Lands
 Twelve-Mile Square Reservation
 Two-Mile Square Reservation
 United States Military District
 Virginia Military District
 Zane's Tracts or Zane's Grant or Ebenezer Zane Tract (see Zane's Trace)

See also
 Historic regions of the United States
 Protected areas of Ohio

External links
The Evolution of Ohio (OPLIN)
 
Ohio Department of Natural Resources. Original Land Subdivisions of Ohio (PDF). ODNR, Division of Geological Survey. Map MG-2. 2003/2006. (Archived from original).
 American Surveyor article

Former regions and territories of the United States
Geography of Ohio
Pre-statehood history of Ohio
Surveying of the United States
Northwest Territory